Pristimantis mendax is a species of frog in the family Strabomantidae.
It is endemic to Peru.
Its natural habitats are tropical moist lowland forests and moist montane forests.

References

mendax
Endemic fauna of Peru
Amphibians of Peru
Amphibians of the Andes
Amphibians described in 1978
Taxonomy articles created by Polbot